Brat TV is a digital media network, which was launched in 2017 and is available on YouTube. The network features original shows and is intended for teenagers of Generation Z. The original script features popular teenage social media celebrities in videos ranging from six to twenty-five minutes long. Brat's flagship web series, Chicken Girls, featured many social media influencers. A subsequent movie, based on Chicken Girls, was released later titled as Chicken Girls: The Movie. Brat has also produced shows starring numerous teenage TV and movie stars from Disney Channel and Nickelodeon, such as Jules LeBlanc, Anna Cathcart, Francesca Capaldi, and Emily Skinner. A linear version of the channel is also available through advertising-supported over-the-top media services.

History
Brat was launched in 2017 by television writer Rob Fishman and Darren Lachtman as an online network featuring scripted content, streaming for free on YouTube. The company originally received $2.5 million in seed funding from a range of investors. Fishman saw a gap in the online market for high-quality teenage shows available for free on digital platforms. The content produced by Brat is structured as several short web series starring popular teenage internet celebrities. Fishman noted how the selected social media celebrities all brought their own established audiences to Brat's shows, describing them as "under-leveraged media property". The name of the network was inspired by the "Brat Pack" movies of the 1980s.

On September 5, 2017, Brat premiered Chicken Girls, which is to date Brat's longest running series.

The most viewed episode (not including movies, music videos, trailers, sneak peeks, behind the scenes content, or bonus content) on Brat of all time is the ninth episode of season one of Mani, which is called "I'm the Captain Now". It stands at over 20 million views as of February 1, 2021. The episode originally premiered on December 6, 2017.

In addition to teenage internet celebrities, Brat’s content would also star people who have worked with Disney Channel and Nickelodeon.

In 2018, Brat premiered 3 shows that were different than its usual single-camera shows: Brat Chat which was a talk show hosted by Indiana Massara and Darius Marcell that premiered in June, The Talent Show which was a competition series to find Brat’s next star (it was hosted by Casey Simpson. The usual set of judges consisted of Sofie Dossi, Bryce Xavier, and Jordyn Jones) that was released in August, and Hotel Du Loone which was a multi-cam sitcom that (like Brat Chat) was released in June. A film based on Chicken Girls was released in 2018 as part of a deal with Studio L, a digital content division of Lionsgate Before the film's release, Brat and Lionsgate amicably canceled their partnership. The film was designed to provide an alternative to what had been covered in the series and premiered in June.

Chicken Girls: The Movie was released in June 2018, and ended up becoming Brat’s most popular project of all time, as it has more than 37 million views as of January 15, 2022.

In December 2018, Brat premiered the Brat Holiday Spectacular starring Mackenzie Ziegler, Jules LeBlanc, Indiana Massara, Sofie Dossi, Aliyah Moulden, Kelsey Cook, Jay Ulloa, Bryce Xavier, Emily Skinner, Darius Marcell, Billy LeBlanc, Paul Thomas Arnold, Tristan Tales, and Tiffany Jeneen.

In March 2019, Brat premiered Spring Breakaway starring Jules LeBlanc, Lilia Buckingham, Anna Cathcart, Kianna Naomi, William Franklyn-Miller, Jay Ulloa, Chase Keith, Paul Toweh, and Alex Guzman.

In August 2019, Brat premiered Intern-in-Chief which featured Jules LeBlanc, Kianna Naomi, Kennedy Walsh, Brooke Butler, Riley Lewis, Giorgio Antoniazzi, William Franklyn-Miller, Bryce Xavier, Indiana Massara, Hayley LeBlanc, Matthew Sato, Rush Holland, Madison Lewis, Aliyah Moulden, and Nathan Ray Clark, Kiki Haynes, Richard Roddy, Rebecca Knowles

Shows

Current shows

Films

Former programming

Facebook Watch

Brat had also filmed a show for their main channel on YouTube called Theater Kids, but it never aired at all.

Other media

Other channels

B-Sides
In February 2020, Brat launched a YouTube channel called Music by Brat TV (formerly B-SIDES), which dedicated to original songs by Brat stars, as well as covers of existing songs.

Past Your Bedtime (formerly known as Yearbook)
In February 2020, Brat launched a YouTube channel called Yearbook that features its stars in different series of videos, often interviews or recaps:
 Best Day Ever
 Chemistry
 Dear Diary
 Honor Roll
 @me
 Meet My Pet
 Portrait Mode
 Sip or Spill
 Study Hall
 Tuesday Tea
Some of Yearbook’s videos had been posted on Brat’s IGTV.

Yearbook was rebranded in February 2022 as Past Your Bedtime, a channel featuring podcasts produced by Brat, such as:
 Sip or Spill (with Tati Mitchell & Louis Levanti)
 The Comment Section (with Drew Afualo)
 Anonomously Yours (with Teala Dunn)
 Keep Kickin’ (with Kai Novak)
 Interview With My Kid (with Jesse & Arlo Sullivan)
 Reading The Stars (with Antoni Bumba)
 Me Time (with Jack Wright)
 The Beauty Breakdown (with Glamzilla)
 Looking For
 I’m Literally Screaming (with Spencewuah)
 I’ll Be Your Sister (with Ellie Zieler)
 Best Friends For Real (with Gabby Morrison & Jada Wesley)

Snapchat
Brat TV has also launched several Snapchat series that recap pop culture and current events primarily concerning notable influencers.
 Past Your Bedtime
 Hot Take
 Beauty Beat
 Get The Lewk

Books
In March 2019, Brat partnered with Sky Pony Press to release a junior novel based on the Chicken Girls series, entitled "Rhyme and the Runaway Twins".

IGTV
 Attaway Looks
 Brat Asks
 Brat Radio
 Fast Friends
 Fly So High
 Past Your Bedtime
 Trivia Night
 True or Nah
 Wednesday Wisdom

Podcast
In August 2019, Brat partnered with Art19 to produce a set of podcasts, the first of which served as a spin-off of Attaway Appeal.

References

External links

Brat (digital network)
Digital media
Streaming television in the United States
YouTube channels launched in 2017